Ten Lives, the fourth album by British singer-songwriter and jazz musician Gwyneth Herbert, was released on 1 July 2008.

History
In early 2008, Herbert was commissioned by a collaborative project between Peter Gabriel and Bowers & Wilkins to record an acoustic album at Gabriel's Real World Studios. The result of these sessions – Ten Lives – was released as a digital download in July 2008, available only from the Bowers & Wilkins website as part of their Music Club. The music was later made available for downloading from other music websites.

Remixed versions of these songs, all written by Herbert, formed the basis of her 2009 album All the Ghosts.

Track listing

References

External links
 Gwyneth Herbert: official website

2008 albums
Peter Gabriel
Gwyneth Herbert albums
Real World Records albums